Corydoras spectabilis is a tropical freshwater fish belonging to the Corydoradinae sub-family of the family Callichthyidae. It originates in inland waters in South America. Corydoras spectabilis is found in the Guaporé River basin in Brazil.

References

Knaack, J., 1999. Erstbeschreibung Corydoras spectabilis n. sp. VDA-aktuell 1:74-79 

Corydoras
Catfish of South America
Fish of Brazil
Taxa named by Joachim Knaack
Fish described in 1999